NGC 275 is a barred spiral galaxy located approximately 63 million light-years from the Solar System in the constellation Cetus. It is one of a pair of galaxies, the other being NGC 274. It was discovered on October 9, 1828, by John Herschel.

The galaxy was described as "very faint, small, round, southeastern of 2" by John Dreyer in the New General Catalogue, with the other of the two galaxies being NGC 274.

See also 
 Spiral galaxy 
 List of NGC objects (1–1000)

References

External links 
 
 
 SEDS

0275
18281009
Cetus (constellation)
Spiral galaxies
Interacting galaxies
Discoveries by John Herschel
002984